William John Hughes (14 November 1859 – 4 December 1934) was a New Zealand cricketer who played first-class cricket for Hawke's Bay from 1892 to 1906.

Hughes was born in Invercargill and lived for some years in Timaru. A medium-paced bowler, he was one of the leading players for South Canterbury in the 1880s before moving to Napier in 1891. He took 5 for 40 and 2 for 29 for Hawke's Bay against Auckland in 1894-95. His best figures were 6 for 80 in the first innings against Wellington in 1898-99; he had taken the only wicket to fall in the second innings when rain washed out the rest of the match.

Hughes worked as a law clerk for a firm of solicitors in Napier. He died in December 1934, survived by his wife and their two daughters. He was still playing club cricket in Napier, and taking wickets, a few days before his death at the age of 75.

References

External links

1859 births
1934 deaths
Cricketers from Invercargill
New Zealand cricketers
Hawke's Bay cricketers